This is a list of lakes in Wales, including those created as reservoirs. The names of most lakes in Wales start with the word "Llyn", which is Welsh for "lake". Except where otherwise referenced, all lakes listed here are named on the relevant Ordnance Survey map at 1:25000 scale.

By area
In terms of surface area, the ten largest lakes in Wales are
Bala Lake (Llyn Tegid) — 
Llyn Trawsfynydd — 
Lake Vyrnwy — 
Llyn Brenig — 
Llyn Celyn — 
Llyn Alaw — 
Claerwen Reservoir — 
Clywedog Reservoir — 
Nant-y-moch Reservoir — 
Caban Coch Reservoir — 

All of the above, with the exception of Bala Lake, are reservoirs held back by dams. Bala Lake was the largest natural lake in Wales though its level has been artificially controlled by sluices since about 1804. The largest natural lake in South Wales is Llangorse Lake (Llyn Syfaddan), which is also the second largest natural lake.

By unitary authority

Grid references identify the approximate centre of the lake or the dam in the case of artificial reservoirs. For some lakes the unitary authority boundary passes through a lake; in these cases the lake is represented in the list for each appropriate authority. Known occurrences include Llyn Brenig, Pontsticill Reservoir, Llwyn-on Reservoir, Cantref Reservoir and Dol-y-gaer Reservoir. All occurrences are marked with an asterisk (*).

Anglesey

Blaenau Gwent

Bridgend

Caerphilly

Cardiff

Carmarthenshire

Ceredigion

Conwy

Denbighshire

Flintshire

Gwynedd

Merthyr Tydfil

Monmouthshire

Neath Port Talbot

Pembrokeshire

Powys

Note: Caban Coch and Garreg-ddu reservoirs are separately named but form one contiguous area of water at normal levels. The area quoted is for the two combined. At high water levels, Pentwyn Reservoir is continuous with Pontsticill Reservoir, its dam being submerged.

Rhondda Cynon Taf

Swansea

Torfaen

Vale of Glamorgan

Wrexham

By national park
Lakes and reservoirs within each of Wales' three national parks.

Brecon Beacons

Pembrokeshire Coast

Snowdonia

By supply to England
Many Welsh lakes supply the nation itself with water, however, some lakes and reservoirs supply England.

The main reservoirs created for this purpose include:

Former lakes

References

 List of lakes
Wales
Lakes